Opaci is a village in Căușeni District, Moldova. The population in 2012 was 3,114. There were 1,560 men and 1,554 women.

Notable people  
 Ion Ungureanu 
 Andrei Ivanțoc

References

Villages of Căușeni District
2. https://www.citypopulation.de/php/moldova-admin.php?adm2id=073385,